A mind sport, is a game of skill based on intellectual ability.

Etymology 
The first major use of the term was as a result of the Mind Sports Olympiad in 1997. The phrase had been used prior to this event such as backgammon being described as a mind sport by Tony Buzan in 1996; Tony Buzan was also a co-founder of the Mind Sports Olympiad. Bodies such as the World Memory Sports Council use the term retrospectively.

It is a term that became fixed from games trying to obtain equal status to sports. For example, from 2002 British Minister for Sport, Richard Caborn said: ...I believe we should have the same obligation to mental agility as we do to physical agility. Mind sports have to form UK national bodies and get together with the government to devise an acceptable amendment to the 1937 Act that clearly differentiates mind sports from parlour board games.

Many of the games' official bodies which had come together for the Mind Sports Olympiad, formed larger organisations such as the Mind Sports Council and International Mind Sports Association (IMSA). With IMSA organising the World Mind Sports Games in Beijing 2008 for contract bridge, chess, go, draughts and xiangqi many other bodies have lobbied for inclusion such as the International Federation of Poker, which won provisional membership at the annual congress of SportAccord in Dubai in 2009.

The term also includes mental calculation or memory disciplines as presented in International competitions such as the Mental Calculation World Cup (held bi-annually since 2004) and the World Memory Championships (held annually since 1991)

Games called mind sports 
As well as board and card games, other disciplines that have been described as mind sports are speed reading, competitive programming and cybersecurity wargames. Other events that have been included where the physical element is comparable to the mental component such as when the official Mind Sports South Africa accepted speed-texting as a mind sport.

See also 
 Esports
 International Mathematical Olympiad
 International Olympiad in Informatics
 International Science Olympiad
 List of Go organizations
 List of world championships in mind sports
 World Chess Championship
 World Bridge Championships
 World Xiangqi Championship
 World Memory Championships
 Extreme Memory Tournament
 World Puzzle Championship
 World Rubik's Cube Championships
 World Sudoku Championship
World Quizzing Championship
 Mensa Mind Games

References

External links 
 Mind Sports Olympiad games A-Z
 Who Is the all-time greatest Mind Sports Champion?, Raymond Keene, 7 September 2008

Sports by type